League of Communists – Movement for Yugoslavia (abbr. СК-ПЈ, SK-PJ) was a political party formed by members of the Yugoslav People's Army in 1990 active in Serbia. The party was based on former party organizations within the army. In 1994 it joined the Yugoslav Left party led by Mirjana Marković.

The party was formed on November 4, 1990 at Belgrade's Sava Centar.

Members
Members included:
Veljko Kadijević
Branko Mamula
Nikola Ljubičić
Lazar Mojsov
Stevan Mirković
Petar Gračanin
Mirjana Marković
Aleksandar Vulin

References

1990 establishments in Yugoslavia
Communist parties in Serbia
Defunct political parties in Serbia
Political parties established in 1990
Political parties in Yugoslavia